Rebecca Ayoko (born in Agogo around 1960) is an international catwalk model from Togo.

Career 
Rebecca was born to Togolese parents in Agogo, Ghana, West Africa. She grew up in a poor family and suffered abuses in her childhood. Rebecca sold doughnuts as a child.

Former advertising star for Kodak, Rebecca Ayoko went in 1980 to Paris, France, where she was noticed by Hachette Filipacchi's team. She also met Regis Pagniez, then director of Lui, and joined the Glamor model agency. She met with Yves Saint Laurent, whom at the time was one of the first few black models to walk at events in the mid-1980s. She worked as a model for next decade. She became the face and star of different fashion shows. She got contracted to work for  French luxury fashion house Saint Laurent. After several years as face of fashion house, Rebecca was replaced by Katoucha Niane as face of Yves Saint Laurent (YST). In 2012, she published an autobiography entitled Quand les étoiles deviennent noires. The book was published by the French publishing house Jean-Claude Gawsewitch Éditeur. She dedicated her autobiography publication to her two children

References 

Togolese female models
20th-century Togolese women
21st-century Togolese women